Silpa Avenue Colony (Hyderabad) is one of residential location near Hydernagar. It is located 20.9 kilometres (12.9 mi) northwest of Hyderabad, is part of GHMC and 100% HUDA approved colony with 226 plots and six parks. Transportation is managed by UMTA.

It has six parks with two parks fully developed, upscale residential apartments and communities with Manjira Drinking Water Pipeline connection available. It is developing into a major serene residential colony which is 100% HUDA approved. The colony having all facilities like Shops, Parks, and also strategically located having within 3 km radius Metro Rail, MMTS Rail, Farmers Market, Forum Mall, and Cinema Halls. Also the colony is surrounded by Miyapur on one side, Kondapur on another and also Hitech city on one side and Kukatpally on another side. It is designated as a "high-rise" zone and the demand for real-estate has skyrocketed. The colony is just a 5 minute drive to Hitech City, the hub of information technology in Hyderabad. It is one of Hyderabad's fastest growing calm residential colony. People love to reside in this serene environment and also enjoy easy access to all the essential and desirable locations including markets, malls, cinema halls, hospitals, and hi-tech city.

About Silpa Avenue Colony

Languages
Telugu is the Local Language here.

Transport for Silpa Avenue Colony

Rail

Hafizpeta Rail Way Station and Hitech Rail Way Station are the very nearby railway stations to Silpa Avenue Colony. However, Secunderabad Central Railway Station is 18 km from Silpa Avenue Colony. Metro Railway Station is 1 km from Silpa Avenue Colony.

Local Bus

Hafeezpet Bus Stop Bus Station, Miyapur Bus Stop Bus Station, Miyapur X Roads Bus Station, Kondapur Bus Stop Bus Station, Hydernagar Bus Station are the nearby by Local Bus Stops to Silpa Avenue Colony .

Airport 

Even though Airport is 38 km from Silpa Avenue Colony as ORR is very close to Silpa Avenue Colony the driving time is just 42 min.

Sujana Forum Mall 

The Forum Sujana Mall is just 2 km from Silpa Avenue Colony

Neighbourhoods in Hyderabad, India
Ranga Reddy district